Maiden Peak is a  summit located in Olympic National Park, in Clallam County of Washington state. It is part of the Olympic Mountains and is situated near the eastern end of Hurricane Ridge within the Daniel J. Evans Wilderness. The nearest higher neighbor is Elk Mountain,  to the west-southwest, and Blue Mountain is set  to the east-northeast. The peak is set approximately midway along the trail which connects Deer Park and Obstruction Point. Precipitation runoff from the south slope of the mountain drains into Grand Creek, whereas the north slope is drained by Maiden Creek, and all ultimately reaches the Strait of Juan de Fuca. This landform's name was officially adopted in 1961 by the U.S. Board on Geographic Names. One story has the origin of the name being derived from nearby Maiden Lake where young men and women camped around 1913, and the other being from a group of hikers that passed this area.

Climate

Set in the north-central portion of the Olympic Mountains, Maiden Peak is located in the marine west coast climate zone of western North America. Most weather fronts originate in the Pacific Ocean, and travel east toward the Olympic Mountains. As fronts approach, they are forced upward by the peaks of the Olympic Range, causing them to drop their moisture in the form of rain or snowfall (Orographic lift). As a result, the Olympics experience high precipitation, especially during the winter months in the form of snowfall. During winter months, weather is usually cloudy, but, due to high pressure systems over the Pacific Ocean that intensify during summer months, there is often little or no cloud cover during the summer. Because of maritime influence, snow tends to be wet and heavy, resulting in avalanche danger.

Geology

The Olympic Mountains are composed of obducted clastic wedge material and oceanic crust, primarily Eocene sandstone, turbidite, and basaltic oceanic crust. The mountains were sculpted during the Pleistocene era by erosion and glaciers advancing and retreating multiple times.

Gallery

See also

 Olympic Mountains
 Geology of the Pacific Northwest

References

External links

 Weather forecast: Maiden Peak
 
 Deer Park to Maiden Peak trail: Washington Trails Association

Mountains of Washington (state)
Olympic Mountains
Mountains of Clallam County, Washington
Landforms of Olympic National Park
North American 1000 m summits